Xeno may refer to:

Prefix
 xeno-, a Greek prefix meaning "foreign"
 xeno-, an affix used in taxonomy

People
Xeno Müller (born 1972), Swiss athlete
Randy Hogan (musician), nicknamed Xeno, the original lead singer for the band Cheap Trick

Games
 Xeno (video game), a 1986 action video game for the ZX Spectrum
 Xeno (series), a series of Japanese role-playing video games

Other
 Xeno (album), 2015 album by Japanese band Crossfaith
 Xeno, Salamis, an area in Salamis Island
 a fictional character in the Malaysian animated series Rimba Racer

See also 

 Xenon (disambiguation)
 Xenic (disambiguation)
 Zeno (disambiguation)
 Xenu (disambiguation)
 Xena (disambiguation)
 Xenos (disambiguation)